Mango Groove: Live in Concert is a concert video released by South African fusion group Mango Groove in 2011.

In addition to the 19 songs performed at the concert, the DVD includes songs, music videos, and an electronic press kit from the band's 2009 album, Bang the Drum. It also includes a digital photo montage in tribute to the Endangered Wildlife Trust, an environmental organisation in South Africa. The song "Belong" (from Bang the Drum) is the musical score for the montage. The music videos are "This Is Not a Party" and "Give It (All Day, All Night)". A third music video, for the song "Everyone's Dancing", is a collection of footage from the concert.

Production
The concert was filmed on 18 September 2010 at Carnival City Casino's Big Top Arena in Boksburg, using 10 high-definition video cameras. Although Mango Groove concerts had been taped before for feature-length television specials, this was their first concert to be commercially distributed on DVD-Video. The video shoot was scheduled for July, but had to be postponed when lead singer Claire Johnston lost her voice after contracting influenza.

Wendy Ramokgadi choreographed dance routines for the band's dancers, The Mangoettes. Ramokgadi had worked with Mango Groove years earlier to choreograph concerts and music videos—such as for the songs "Hometalk" and "Special Star". The video shoot was directed by Michael Scheider, and produced by Alphacam Africa. The lighting and visuals were by the event production company Sound Stylists. The show was seated to capacity and the band performed 19 songs.

Reception
A reviewer for Drum magazine praised the music and the show's sound and visuals. Anton Marshall of Channel24 called the DVD "a much-needed document of how music of one era remains critically important as a national treasure". YOU magazine rated the DVD four stars out of five, as did Drum and Channel24.

Track list

See also

 Live at the Royal Albert Hall (1999) by Ladysmith Black Mambazo

References

External links
 
 

2011 live albums
EMI Records live albums
Live albums by South African artists
Live jazz-pop albums
Live video albums
2010s English-language films